The 1966–67 Athenian League season was the 44th in the history of Athenian League. The league consisted of 48 teams.

Premier Division

The division featured two new teams, both promoted from last season's Division One:
 Bishop's Stortford  (1st)
 Harwich & Parkeston (2nd)

League table

Division One

The division featured 4 new teams:
 2 relegated from last season's Premier Division:
 Carshalton Athletic (15th)
 Hornchurch (16th)
 2 promoted from last season's Division Two:
 Croydon Amateurs (1st)
 Cheshunt (2nd)

League table

Division Two

The division featured 3 new teams:
 2 relegated from last season's Division One:
 Horsham (15th)
 Eastbourne (16th)
 1 joined the division:
 Boreham Wood, from Spartan League

League table

References

1966–67 in English football leagues
Athenian League